Vanand is a village located in the southwestern portion of the Armavir Province in Armenia, 5 kilometers from the Armenian border with Turkey. The village was founded in 1984 from a sovkhoz (collective farm), and was an area that was once closed to foreigners. There is a single school (179 students), house of culture, community center, kindergarten, and no cultural heritage monuments.

See also 
Armavir Province
Vanand, an area of historic Armenia

References

External links 

 Vanand secondary school

Populated places in Armavir Province
Populated places established in 1984
Cities and towns built in the Soviet Union